HMS Eglinton (L87) was a Type I Hunt-class destroyer of the Royal Navy built by Vickers-Armstrongs on the River Tyne, and launched on 28 December 1939. She was adopted by the town of Alton, Hampshire, as part of the Warship Week campaign in 1942.

Service history
Eglinton served with the 16th Destroyer Flotilla at Harwich for the whole of her wartime service. She was involved in two actions with German S-Boats whilst escorting East coast convoys. She also was part of the support force for the Normandy landings.

After August 1945 she was decommissioned and placed in reserve at Harwich. On 24 June 1955 she was designated as a trials ship for exercise 'Sleeping Beauty' designed to test the state of ships held in reserve, and the time taken to bring them forward for service in the active fleet. She was sold for scrapping and arrived for scrapping at Blyth by Hughes Bolckow on 28 May 1956.

References

Publications
 
 English, John (1987). The Hunts: a history of the design, development and careers of the 86 destroyers of this class built for the Royal and Allied Navies during World War II. England: World Ship Society. .

External links
 Profile on naval-history.net

 

Hunt-class destroyers of the Royal Navy
Naval ships of Operation Neptune
Ships built by Vickers Armstrong
Ships built on the River Tyne
1939 ships
World War II destroyers of the United Kingdom